Mads Hamberg Andersen (born 3 August 1983) is a Danish footballer whose primary position is goalkeeper.

He currently plays for FC Helsingør.

References

1983 births
Danish men's footballers
Living people
FC Helsingør players
Association football goalkeepers